Erick Mombaerts (born 21 April 1955) is a French football manager and former player.

Playing career 
Mombaerts is a youth product of INF Vichy. He went on to play for Nœux-les-Mines and Montluçon before retiring in 1984.

Coaching career
Mombaerts began his coaching career with Paris Saint-Germain, taking charge between October 1987 and February 1988. Mombaerts was manager of Guingamp during the 1989–90 season. He then managed Cannes between January 1992 and December 1992, and Toulouse from 2001 to 2006. While with Toulouse he won the Ligue 2 championship in 2003.

After coaching their under-18 team, Mombaerts became manager of the French under-21 team in April 2008. He left that position in October 2012.

Mombaerts became manager at Le Havre in December 2012. He resigned in December 2014.

He was appointed as the head coach of Japanese club Yokohama F. Marinos in December 2014.

Mombaerts stepped down as head coach of the Marinos at the succession of the 2017 Emperor's Cup, on 1 January 2018.

Mombaerts was appointed manager of Melbourne City on 27 June 2019. On 3 September 2020, Erick stood down from the coaching role at City to return to France, handing the coaching reins over to his assistant Patrick Kisnorbo.

Managerial statistics

References

External links

Profile at Yokohama F. Marinos

1955 births
Living people
Association football midfielders
French footballers
Montluçon Football players
French football managers
Paris Saint-Germain F.C. managers
En Avant Guingamp managers
AS Cannes managers
Toulouse FC managers
France national under-21 football team managers
Le Havre AC managers
J1 League managers
Yokohama F. Marinos managers
Ligue 1 managers
French expatriate football managers
French expatriate sportspeople in Japan
Expatriate football managers in Japan
Melbourne City FC managers
French expatriates in Australia
Expatriate soccer managers in Australia
INF Vichy players
US Nœux-les-Mines players
Sportspeople from Loiret
Footballers from Centre-Val de Loire